The 1984 Atlantic hurricane season was the most active since 1971, though the season was below average in hurricanes and major hurricanes. It officially began on June 1, 1984, and lasted until November 30, 1984. These dates conventionally delimit the period of each year when most tropical cyclones form in the Atlantic basin. The 1984 season was an active one in terms of named storms, but most of them were weak and stayed at sea.  Most of the cyclones tracked through the northwest subtropical Atlantic west of the 50th meridian to near the Eastern coast of the United States between mid-August and early October.  The most damaging storm was Hurricane Klaus, which caused $152 million (1984 dollars) in damage in Puerto Rico. Hurricane Diana was the first hurricane to strike a nuclear power plant without incident; it was also the first major hurricane to strike the U.S. East Coast in nearly 20 years. Also of note was Hurricane Lili, which lasted well after the official end of the season. It was downgraded from a named storm on December 24.  Damage overall from the tropical cyclones in 1984 totaled $228.7 million (1984 USD). Unusually, no hurricanes developed from tropical waves in 1984, which usually are the source of the strongest storms in an Atlantic hurricane season.

Seasonal forecasts

Forecasts of hurricane activity are issued before each hurricane season by noted hurricane experts such as Dr. William M. Gray and his associates at Colorado State University (CSU). A normal season, as defined by the National Oceanic and Atmospheric Administration (NOAA) in the period from 1981 to 2010, has approximately 12 named storms, with 6 of those reaching hurricane status. About 3 hurricanes strengthen into major hurricanes, which are tropical cyclones that reach at least Category 3 intensity on the Saffir–Simpson scale.

Early in 1984, the Weather Research Center (WRC) forecast called for a below-average season with seven named storms, with four of those strengthening into a hurricane. The May 24, 1984, forecasters at CSU predicted a near-average season with a total of 10 tropical storms developing, 7 of which would reach hurricane status. CSU based this prediction on the presence of an El Niño, the Quasi-biennial oscillation, and favorable sea-level pressures over the Caribbean Sea and Gulf of Mexico. These numbers were unchanged in CSU's next season outlook, issued on July 30. None of these predictions included a forecast for the number of major hurricanes. Ultimately, the predictions issued by CSU proved to be too low, with 13 subtropical or tropical storms forming in 1984 and 5 of those reaching hurricane status.

Season summary

Six storms during the season had subtropical characteristics at some point in their track, those being Subtropical Storm One, Tropical Storm Cesar, Hurricane Hortense, Hurricane Josephine, Hurricane Klaus, and Hurricane Lili.

The season's activity was reflected with a cumulative accumulated cyclone energy (ACE) rating of 84, which is classified as "near normal". ACE is, broadly speaking, a measure of the power of the hurricane multiplied by the length of time it existed, so storms that last a long time, as well as particularly strong hurricanes, have high ACEs. It is only calculated for full advisories on tropical systems at or exceeding 39 mph (63 km/h), which is the threshold for tropical storm strength.

Systems

Tropical Depression One

By June 11, an upper-level low caused thunderstorm development off the Florida coast, which caused the formation of a tropical depression. It dissipated as a tropical cyclone on June 14 while moving through the Florida panhandle. The small remnant low continued moving westward inland of the Gulf coast, causing occasional redevelopment of thunderstorm activity as the system moved into Louisiana, before both the thunderstorm activity and low-pressure area dissipated by June 17.

Tropical Depression Two

An upper-level low-pressure area traversing the southern Gulf of Mexico spawned convective activity over the Isthmus of Tehuantepec on June 16. This convective area waxed and waned somewhat in intensity, until becoming a larger disturbance on June 18. A surface low soon formed, and around 12:00 UTC that day, the system developed into a tropical depression over the Bay of Campeche. With vertical wind shear preventing significant further intensification, the depression made landfall near Tampico, Tamaulipas, with winds of 35 mph (55 km/h). The depression quickly dissipated over the mountainous terrain of eastern Mexico.

Tropical Depression Three

Moving west-northwestward, the depression passed between Martinique and Saint Lucia early on the following day. The Castries River overflowed its banks, washing away three homes in the eastern section of Castries. Two commercial fisherman were reported missing. The depression entered the Caribbean Sea and failed to intensify further, dissipating about halfway between the Dominican Republic and Venezuela late on July 26.

Subtropical Storm One

A weak frontal trough generated a low-pressure system that organized into a subtropical depression north of Bermuda on August 18. The depression headed northeast and strengthened to a subtropical storm. It is believed to have merged with a front on August 21. The history of Subtropical Storm One is not entirely certain, as satellite images were largely unavailable due to a failure of the VISSR unit on GOES EAST (then GOES-5), and this system remained at the fringe of the GOES WEST and Meteosat throughout its existence.

Tropical Storm Arthur

A well-defined tropical wave emerged into the Atlantic from the west coast of Africa on August 23. Moving westward and later northwestward, the system remained to the south of a persistent shearing pattern that inhibited the development of several tropical waves. On the next day, another reconnaissance flight recorded tropical storm conditions, and thus, the depression intensified into Tropical Storm Arthur. Arthur was downgraded to a depression on September 1 after being negatively impacted by vertical wind shear, and dissipated on September 5 about halfway between the Bahamas and Bermuda. Despite its close proximity to the Lesser Antilles, Arthur caused no significant impact on land as it was a tropical depression at the time.

Tropical Storm Bertha

On August 26, a tropical wave emerged into the Atlantic from the west coast of Africa. A reconnaissance flight into the depression on August 31 indicated that it strengthened into Tropical Storm Bertha. The system moved northwestward due to a weakening high pressure ridge to the north. Based on observations from reconnaissance flights on September 1, Bertha was downgraded to a tropical depression. On September 2, Bertha turned north-northeastward into response to an approaching cold front. The cold front then eroded the high pressure ridge, causing the cyclone to accelerate northeastward. Bertha later merged with the cold front on September 4.

Tropical Storm Cesar

A second storm formed on August 31 as a non-tropical low strengthened into Tropical Storm Cesar off the East Coast of the United States. Cesar traveled east-northeast and strengthened gradually until it became extratropical and merged with another system off the coast of Newfoundland on September 2.

Tropical Depression Seven

A tropical wave moved across Central America into the far eastern north Pacific Ocean by August 28.  The system moved westward with no signs of development until September 1, when an upper-level low to its north across the Gulf of Mexico caused an area of thunderstorms to form just south of the Mexican coastline.  An upper trough developed across the southern Plains of the United States, which slowly lured the northern portion of this increasingly large disturbance northward through the Mexican Isthmus.  The southern portion moved westward, developing into Hurricane Marie.  For a short while, Marie acted as a source of vertical wind shear from the west for this system, halting further development.

By September 6, the disturbance had emerged into the southwest Gulf of Mexico and consolidated into a smaller system which had enough organization to be classified as a tropical depression, the seventh of the season.  The depression moved north-northwest into northeast Mexico on the afternoon of September 7, dissipating completely on September 8.

Hurricane Diana

On September 8, an extratropical cyclone organized into Tropical Storm Diana north of the Bahamas. Diana proved difficult for meteorologists to forecast, initially moving westward towards Cape Canaveral, but then turned to the north and paralleled the coastline. On September 11, the storm reached hurricane strength, and continued to intensify to a Category 4 hurricane. Diana moved north-northeast, and performed a small anti-cyclonic loop before striking near Cape Fear as a minimal Category 2 hurricane on September 13. A weakened Tropical Storm Diana curved back out to sea and headed northeast until it became extratropical near Newfoundland on September 16.

Damage estimates were set at $65.5 million. Three indirect deaths were associated with Diana. Diana was the first hurricane to strike a nuclear power plant — the Carolina Power and Light Brunswick Nuclear Power Plant recorded sustained hurricane-force winds, but there was no damage to the facility.

Tropical Storm Edouard

The origins of Tropical Storm Edouard are unclear, but an area of persistent organized storms formed in the Bay of Campeche, which strengthened into a tropical storm on September 14. Edouard rapidly intensified, with wind speeds reaching  in 18 hours as a faint eye feature became visible. Following its strengthening, Edouard dissipated even more quickly, degenerating into an area of thunderstorms the next day. The remnants of Edouard moved over land near the port of Veracruz.

Tropical Storm Fran

On September 14, a well-defined tropical wave exited the coast of Africa. The next day, it had rapidly organized into a tropical depression. On the afternoon of September 16 the depression attained tropical storm strength, and it was given the name Fran. It turned to the northwest, and passed very near the Cape Verde. 31 people were killed in the country. Fran continued between the northwest and west-northwest on September 17–18 as it continued to organize. As Fran passed the Cape Verde islands weather stations reported  winds, which is tropical depression force. During the period of September 19–20 Fran turned towards westward and began to encounter strong upper-level wind shear, which caused Fran to dissipate on September 20.

Tropical Storm Gustav

Gustav spent most of its life as a well-organized tropical depression, which formed on September 16 in the open Atlantic south of Bermuda. The depression moved north, and its motion stalled over Bermuda on September 17. A day later, the depression had strengthened to a tropical storm and was named Gustav. Tropical Storm Gustav headed northeast until it was absorbed by a front on September 19.

Hurricane Hortense

A large frontal system spawned a subtropical depression early on September 23, about 385 miles (620 km) east of Bermuda. Ship and satellite data confirmed its development, and indicated the system intensified into a subtropical storm later on September 23. Initially the cyclone moved toward the south-southwest, although on September 24 it turned to the west. That day, the hurricane hunters reported that the system transitioned into a tropical cyclone; as such, it was named Tropical Storm Hortense. The newly-tropical storm quickly intensified while turning to the northwest, and late on September 25 Hortense attained hurricane status, about 300 miles (475 km) southeast of Bermuda.

Twelve hours after reaching hurricane status, Hortense began a sharp weakening trend while passing east of Bermuda. By September 27 it was a minimal tropical storm, and subsequently it executed a clockwise loop to the southwest. The intensity of Hortense fluctuated slightly over the subsequent few days, although it never regained its former intensity. Hortense accelerated to the northeast, moving rapidly across the north Atlantic before being absorbed by a larger extratropical storm late on October 2, northwest of the Azores.

Tropical Storm Isidore

A tropical depression formed on September 25 off the southeastern Bahamas. The depression headed west, and was upgraded to a tropical storm in the central Bahamas on September 26. It struck the US coast near Jupiter, Florida. Retaining tropical storm strength, Isidore curved to the northeast, emerging over water near Jacksonville, Florida. Isidore continued northeast until it was absorbed by a front on October 1. Total damages were estimated at over $750,000 (1984 US dollars). One death from electrocution was reported.

Hurricane Josephine

Josephine became a named storm on October 8 while northwest of Puerto Rico. It briefly moved west then turned almost due north. While it stayed well away from the U.S. coast, Josephine was a large storm and sustained tropical storm winds were measured at the Diamond Shoals of Cape Hatteras. When it passed 36°N latitude (roughly level with Norfolk, Virginia), Josephine curved to the southeast, then back to the northeast. It continued on this path until it made a cyclonic loop beginning on October 17 while becoming extratropical. The storm lost its identity on October 21. The hurricane caused wave damage to coastal areas, but primarily posed a threat to the shipping lanes of the North Atlantic.

Offshore, a sailboat with six crewmen on it became disabled due to high waves, estimated to have exceeded , produced by the hurricane. All of the people on the ship were quickly rescued after issuing a distress signal by a nearby tanker vessel. In Massachusetts, one man drowned after falling off his boat on North River amidst large swells produced by the storm.

October Tropical Depression

This system was recognized as the seventeenth tropical depression of the season by the National Hurricane Center after the season ended. A retrograding upper-level low spurred the development of a low east of the Bahamas on October 25. The system tracked westward with limited shower and thunderstorm activity, crossing Florida on October 26 before moving into the Gulf of Mexico. Once the system moved into the north-central Gulf, deep convection began to develop near its center, expanding in intensity and coverage near and after landfall in extreme southeast Mississippi.  The small system accelerated rapidly to the north and northeast ahead of an approaching cold front, moving across the Tennessee Valley and central Appalachians before linking up with the front and becoming a weak extratropical cyclone. The non-tropical cyclone then moved through coastal New England.

Hurricane Klaus

Forming from a broad area of low pressure on November 5, Klaus maintained a northeast movement throughout much of its path. After making landfall on extreme eastern Puerto Rico, it passed to the north of the Leeward Islands, resulting in strong southwesterly winds and rough seas. Klaus attained hurricane status and reached peak winds of  before becoming extratropical over cooler waters on November 13. The storm dropped heavy rainfall in Puerto Rico, causing minor flooding and light damage. Klaus caused heavy marine damage in the Leeward Islands, including wrecking at least three ships. The Virgin Islands experienced heavy damage, as well.  Damage from the storm totaled to $152 million (1984 USD), and the hurricane killed two on Dominica.

November Tropical Depression

A low-pressure system formed east of Florida on November 22 and rode up the East Coast of the United States producing heavy rain before curving back out to sea and dissipating on November 26. The storm left one fatality and $7.4 million (1984 USD) in damage. There has been evidence that the November storm may have become a subtropical cyclone east of Bermuda. The remnants of the cyclone contributed to formation of a potent nor'easter.

Hurricane Lili

Hurricane Lili was one of only four Atlantic tropical cyclones on record to reach hurricane status in the month of December.  Lili developed as a subtropical cyclone which originated from a frontal trough to the south of Bermuda on December 12. It tracked southeastward, then northward, slowly attaining tropical characteristics and becoming a hurricane on December 20. Lili turned to the south and southwest, briefly threatening the northern Caribbean islands before weakening and dissipating near the coast of the Dominican Republic.  Lili was the longest lasting tropical cyclone outside of the Atlantic hurricane season, as well as the strongest hurricane to form during the month of December. It briefly threatened to pass through the Leeward Islands as a minimal hurricane, though upon passing through the area as a dissipating tropical depression Lili produced light rainfall and no reported damage.

Storm names
The following names were used for named storms that formed in the north Atlantic in 1984. No names were retired, so the same list of names was used again in the 1990 season. This is the first time these names were used since the post-1978 naming change, except for Bertha and Fran which were previously used in 1957 and 1973.

Season effects
This is a table of the storms in 1984 and their landfall(s), if any. Deaths in parentheses are additional and indirect (an example of an indirect death would be a traffic accident), but are still storm-related. Damage and deaths include totals while the storm was extratropical or a wave or low.

|-
| One ||  || bgcolor=#| ||  ||  || Florida ||  ||  ||
|-
| Two ||  || bgcolor=#| ||  ||  || northern Mexico ||  ||  ||
|-
| Three ||  || bgcolor=#| ||  ||  || None ||  ||  ||
|-
| Unnumbered ||  || bgcolor=#| ||  || Unknown || None ||  ||  ||
|-
| One ||  || bgcolor=#| ||  ||  || None ||  ||  ||
|-
| Arthur ||  || bgcolor=#| ||  ||  || None ||  ||  ||
|-
| Bertha ||  || bgcolor=#| ||  ||  || None ||  ||  ||
|-
| Cesar ||  || bgcolor=#| ||  ||  || None ||  ||  ||
|-
| Seven ||  || bgcolor=#| ||  || Unknown || northern Mexico ||  ||  ||
|-
| Diana ||  ||  bgcolor=#|Category 4 hurricane ||  ||  || Southeastern United States ||  || 0 (3) ||
|-
| Edouard ||  || bgcolor=#| ||  ||  || northern Mexico ||  ||  ||
|-
| Fran ||  || bgcolor=#| ||  ||  || Cape Verde Islands ||  || – ||
|-
| Gustav ||  || bgcolor=#| ||  ||  || Bermuda ||  ||  ||
|-
| Hortense ||  || bgcolor=#|Category 1 hurricane ||  ||  || None ||  ||  ||
|-
| Isidore ||  || bgcolor=#| ||  ||  || Bahamas, Southeastern United States ||  || 0 (1) ||
|-
| Josephine ||  ||  bgcolor=#|Category 2 hurricane ||  ||  || East Coast of the United States || Minor ||  ||
|-
| Unnumbered ||  || bgcolor=#| ||  ||  || Southeastern United States ||  ||  ||
|-
| Klaus ||  ||  bgcolor=#|Category 1 hurricane ||  ||  || Puerto Rico, Leeward Islands ||  ||  ||
|-
| Unnumbered ||  || bgcolor=#| ||  ||  || Bahamas, Florida, Bermuda ||  ||  ||
|-
| Lili ||  ||  bgcolor=#|Category 1 hurricane ||  ||  || Puerto Rico, Hispaniola ||  ||  ||
|-

See also

List of Atlantic hurricanes
Atlantic hurricane season
1984 Pacific hurricane season
1984 Pacific typhoon season
1984 North Indian Ocean cyclone season
 Australian cyclone seasons: 1983–84, 1984–85
 South Pacific cyclone seasons: 1983–84, 1984–85
 South-West Indian Ocean cyclone seasons: 1983–84, 1984–85

References

External links
 Monthly Weather Review
 U.S. Rainfall information for tropical cyclones from 1984

 
Atlantic hurricane seasons
Articles which contain graphical timelines
1984 ATL